1031 Arctica, provisional designation , is a dark asteroid from the outer region of the asteroid belt, approximately 75 kilometers in diameter. It was discovered on 6 June 1924, by Soviet−Russian astronomer Sergey Belyavsky at Simeiz Observatory on the Crimean peninsula. It was named for the Arctic Sea.

Classification and orbit 

Arctica orbits the Sun in the outer main-belt at a distance of 2.9–3.2 AU once every 5 years and 4 months (1,944 days). Its orbit has an eccentricity of 0.06 and an inclination of 18° with respect to the ecliptic. The body's observation arc begins with its official discovery observation at Simeiz in 1924.

Physical characteristics 

In the Tholen taxonomic classification scheme, Arctica is a rather rare CX: type, an intermediary between the carbonaceous C and X-type asteroids (also see category listing).

Rotation period 

In February 1992, the first rotational lightcurve of Arctica was obtained by Italian astronomer Mario Di Martino at Torino Observatory, using the ESO 1-metre telescope at La Silla in Chile. It gave a rotation period of 51.0 hours with a change in brightness of 0.22 magnitude.

Since then, photometric observations were taken by French amateur astronomers Raymond Poncy (2005), René Roy (2010) and Patrick Sogorb (2016), giving an identical period of 51 hours, based on a fragmentary and poorly rated lightcurve. While Arctica has a much longer period than most minor planets, it is not a slow rotator, which have periods up to a 1000 or more hours.

Diameter and albedo 

According to the space-based surveys carried out by the Infrared Astronomical Satellite IRAS, the Japanese Akari satellite, and NASA's Wide-field Infrared Survey Explorer with its subsequent NEOWISE mission, Arctica measures between 73.83 and 77.28 kilometers in diameter and its surface has a low albedo between 0.04 and 0.047 (without preliminary results). The Collaborative Asteroid Lightcurve Link adopts the results obtained by IRAS, that is, an albedo of 0.0465 and a diameter of 75.47 kilometers with an absolute magnitude of 9.56.

Naming 

This minor planet was named for the Arctic Sea, located in the Northern Hemisphere and the smallest and shallowest of the world's five major oceanic divisions. Naming citation was first published in The Names of the Minor Planets by Paul Herget in 1955.

References

External links 
 Asteroid Lightcurve Database (LCDB), query form (info )
 Dictionary of Minor Planet Names, Google books
 Asteroids and comets rotation curves, CdR – Observatoire de Genève, Raoul Behrend
 Discovery Circumstances: Numbered Minor Planets (1)-(5000) – Minor Planet Center
 
 

001031
Discoveries by Sergei Belyavsky
Named minor planets
001031
19240606